Newtown and Heatherlands is an electoral ward in Poole, Dorset. Since 2019, the ward has elected 3 councillors to Bournemouth, Christchurch and Poole Council.

Geography 
The ward covers the suburbs of Newtown, Rossmore and Heatherlands.

Councillors 
At the 2019 Bournemouth, Christchurch and Poole Council election, Newton and Heatherlands elected three Liberal Democrat councillors.

Election results

References 

Wards of Bournemouth, Christchurch and Poole
Politics of Poole